The 2010 Faroe Islands Cup started on 20 March 2010 and ended with the final on 6 August 2010. The defending champions were Víkingur Gøta, who won their first cup title in 2009.  The Cup was won by EB/Streymur after they beat ÍF Fuglafjørður in the final.  With the victory, EB/Streymur qualified for the second qualifying round of the 2011–12 UEFA Europa League.

Only the first teams of Faroese football clubs were allowed to participate. The Preliminary Round involved only teams from first, second and third deild. Teams from the highest division entered the competition in the first round.

Preliminary round
These fixtures involve clubs below the Faroe Islands Premier League. These matches took place on 20 March 2010.

|}

First round
Entering in this round are the winners from the preliminary round and the clubs from this year's Faroe Islands Premier League. These matches were played on 27 March 2010 except for the FC Suðuroy – Skála IF match, which was postponed and was played on 21 April 2010.

|}

Quarterfinals
Entering this round are the eight winners from the first round. These matches are scheduled for 25 April.

|}

Semifinals
Entering this round are the four winners from the Quarterfinals. These ties are played over two legs, scheduled for 20 May and 8 June.

|}

Final

Top goalscorers

External links
 Official site 
 soccerandequipment.com
 Faroe Islands Cup on rsssf.com

Faroe Islands Cup seasons
Cup
Faroe Islands Cup